Mehdi Taremi (born 18 July 1992) is an Iranian professional footballer who plays as a striker for Primeira Liga club Porto and the Iran national team.

A late bloomer, he begun his career at Shahin Bushehr and Iranjavan, Taremi played for Persepolis between 2014 and 2018; he was Persian Gulf Pro League top scorer on two occasions (2015–16 and 2016–17). He played for Qatari side Al-Gharafa between 2018 and 2019, before joining Rio Ave in Portugal, with whom he was Primeira Liga joint-top scorer in 2019–20. In 2020, he moved to fellow Portuguese side Porto.

Taremi made his first senior appearance in 2015, and played at the 2018 FIFA World Cup, 2019 AFC Asian Cup and 2022 FIFA World Cup.

Club career

Early career
Taremi started his career with Bargh Bushehr's Academy before moving on to Iranjavan's Youth Academy.

Shahin Bushehr
Taremi joined Shahin Bushehr in the summer of 2010. He played 7 games and scored one goal in all competitions. In the winter of 2012, he was released by Shahin Bushehr to spend his conscription period in a military club, but he failed to join a club and was forced to spend his conscription period in a usual garrison.

Iranjavan
Taremi joined Iranjavan in the summer of 2013 and signed a two-year contract until the end of the 2014–15 season and was given the number 9. Taremi scored 12 times in 22 matches in 2013–14, and became the league's second top scorer after Mokhtar Jomehzadeh.

Persepolis

After becoming the Azadegan League's top scorer, Taremi had offers from many teams. He joined Persepolis FC in the summer of 2014 and signed a two-year contract through June 2016.

2014–15
Taremi made his debut in 1–1 draw with Naft Tehran, coming as a substitute for Reza Norouzi in 90th minute. He scored his first goal for the club on 15 August 2014 in a 1–0 victory over Zob Ahan. On 8 April 2015 Taremi scored a penalty in Persepolis 1–0 win in the Asian Champions League over Saudi Arabian club Al Nassr. He scored many goals for the club, and provided quality assists to win the Best Striker Award of the 14th Persian Gulf Pro League at the end of the 2014–15 season.

2015–16

Taremi missed the first week of the new season due to suspension, but in his first game back on 6 August 2015, he scored in a 2–1 loss to Esteghlal Khuzestan. Taremi scored twice in a 2–0 week five win against Foolad. This was Persepolis' first win of the season and lifted them out of the relegation spot. Taremi's good performances in the month of August earned him the Navad player of the month as voted by fans. On 18 December 2015 Taremi scored a brace against Rah Ahan in Persepolis' 2–0 victory. He ended the first half of the league as top scorer with 9 goals in 12 games.

On 4 April 2016, Taremi scored a brace in a 3–2 victory against Siah Jamegan to keep Persepolis in third place. On 12 April 2016 Taremi was in talks to extend his contract to the end of the 2017–18 season. But, eventually he decided not to renew his contract. On 15 April 2016 Taremi scored a brace in Persepolis' historic 4–2 victory over Esteghlal in the Tehran derby. He became the league's top scorer with 16 goals at the end of the season, despite his good performance his team failed to win the title at the last week.

2016–17
Before the start of the new season, Taremi announced that he would not extend his contract, to join to a European team. In July 2016, it was reported that Taremi was linked to Süper Lig team Çaykur Rizespor. The move was cancelled after Taremi returned to Iran and signed a two-year contract with Persepolis. He played his first match for Persepolis in 1–0 win over Saipa, replaced Omid Alishah in 77th minute. He also scored his first goal of the season in week 4 against Saba Qom. He scored a brace in 3–1 away win over Sepahan At the end of the season, the club celebrated its 10th Iran Pro League title, and Taremi became top scorer for a second consecutive season with 18 goals.

On 8 May 2017, Taremi scored a decisive hat trick against Emirati side Al Wahda in a 4–2 win to help his team qualify for the Round of 16 of the 2017 AFC Champions League. After his good performances, Taremi was linked with Dinamo Zagreb.

2017–18

Taremi played seven games, scoring on four occasions. During the 2017–18 season, Taremi was banned for four months because of a contract dispute with Turkish club Çaykur Rizespor dating back to June 2016, when the player reached an agreement to join the club and later returned to Persepolis. Persepolis were also banned from signing players for two transfer windows. FIFA ruled in favor of the Turkish club and imposed the ban.

Al Gharafa
On 8 January 2018, Taremi signed an 18-month contract with the Qatari club Al-Gharafa. He scored his first goal in the first match of 2018 AFC Champions League against UAE's Al Jazira. Taremi first scored goal in Qatar League against Al Kharaitiyat SC on 16 February. On 19 February, he scored a brace against Iranian side Tractor Sazi on the second matchday of the AFC Champions League.

Rio Ave 
On 23 July 2019, Taremi signed a two-year contract with Portuguese football club Rio Ave. Taremi scored a hat-trick in his first Primeira Liga start for the club on 23 August 2019 in a match against C.D. Aves. On 31 August, Taremi won his side three penalties in their match against Sporting CP, all on fouls committed by Sebastián Coates, as Rio Ave won 3–2.

Taremi finished his first season with 18 goals, joint top with S.L. Benfica pair Pizzi and Carlos Vinícius; the latter won the official Bola da Prata trophy for playing the fewest minutes of the three.

Porto 

In August 2020, Taremi signed a four-year contract with Portuguese club FC Porto. He scored his first league goal for Porto on 8 November 2020 in a 3–1 home win against Portimonense. There was a foul on Taremi during the 2020 Supertaça Cândido de Oliveira in December 2020 which gave Porto a penalty and resulted in their first goal of the match scored by Sérgio Oliveira. Porto went on to win the 42nd edition of the competition 2–0, which gave Mehdi Taremi his first European medal. On 17 February 2021, Taremi opened the scoring for Porto against Juventus in the round-of-16 first leg in the UEFA Champions League. He became the first Iranian to score in the first knockout phase of the competition. On 13 April, he scored the game-winning goal with a spectacular bicycle kick in a 1–0 away win over Chelsea in the Champions League quarter-finals, yet his club lost 1–2 on aggregate. After the final, his goal against Chelsea was voted as the best goal of the season's Champions League. The goal also won the "UEFA.com Goal of the Season" award, and was later nominated for the FIFA Puskás Award. Taremi finished the 2020–21 season with 16 goals and 11 assists.

Taremi won his first Primeira Liga title in the 2021-22 season with FC Porto. His contributions that season included 20 goals and 12 assists. He was the second-highest goalscorer and the third-highest playmaker through assists that season.

International career

Youth
Taremi played for Iran student's national football team in Turkey tournament and scored 9 goals for the team. He was called up by Alireza Mansourian to participate in the team's training camp in Kish Island in 2013.

Senior

Taremi made his debut against Uzbekistan in a friendly match on 11 June 2015. He also came on as a second-half substitute in a World Cup Qualifying match against Turkmenistan on 16 June 2015.

On 3 September 2015, Taremi scored his first senior goals, a brace, in a 6–0 victory over Guam in a 2018 FIFA World Cup qualifier. On 23 March 2017, Taremi scored the winning and only goal in Iran's victory against Qatar in the final round of World Cup qualifying. He followed this up with another goal on 28 March 2017, in a 1–0 victory against China. On 12 June 2017, Taremi scored the second goal for Iran in a 2–0 win over Uzbekistan to seal the country's first consecutive qualification to two World Cups. In June 2018, he was named in Iran's final 23-man squad for the 2018 FIFA World Cup in Russia. With the score tied 1–1 in stoppage time in Iran's group stage match with Portugal, Taremi missed a point-blank shot wide left that would have eliminated Portugal and advanced Iran to the round of 16.

He was also named in Iran's final 26-man squad by Carlos Queiroz for the 2022 FIFA World Cup. In the first group stage game, he scored two goals as Iran lost 6-2 to England.

Personal life
Taremi is the third and the youngest child of his family. His older brother Mohammad is also a football player.

He was in a relationship with Iranian actress Sahar Ghoreishi for months in 2018. In March 2020, Taremi announced he is in a new relationship and prepares for marriage.

On 15 April 2022, Sporting CP, a rival of Taremi's current club FC Porto, published an article on their club website and referred to Taremi as "a true snake charmer, someone from Persia always ready to go and perform circus tricks". The article was met with lots of criticism from both Porto fans and Iranians, including the Iranian Ambassador to Portugal, Morteza Damanpak. The article was later deleted by the club.

Career statistics

Club

International

Scores and results list Iran's goal tally first, score column indicates score after each Taremi goal.

Honours
Persepolis
Persian Gulf Pro League: 2016–17
Iranian Super Cup: 2017

Al-Gharafa
Qatari Stars Cup: 2018–19

Porto
Primeira Liga: 2021–22
Taça de Portugal: 2021–22
Taça da Liga: 2022–23
Supertaça Cândido de Oliveira: 2020, 2022

Individual
Iranian Footballer of the Year: 2016, 2017
Persian Gulf Pro League Striker of the Year: 2014–15, 2015–16, 2016–17
Persian Gulf Pro League Top Goalscorer: 2015–16, 2016–17
Persian Gulf Pro League Team of the Year: 2014–15, 2015–16, 2016–17
Azadegan League Top Goalscorer (Group B): 2013–14
Primeira Liga Team of the Year: 2019–20, 2020–21, 2021–22
Primeira Liga Top scorer: 2019–20
Rio Ave Player of the Year: 2019–20
Primeira Liga Player of the Month: September 2022
Primeira Liga Forward of the Month: December 2020, January 2021, February 2021, September 2022
SJPF Player of the Month: January 2021, September 2022, November 2022, December 2022
UEFA Fans' Goal of the Tournament: 2020–21
 4th top scorer: UEFA 2022

See also 
 List of Primeira Liga hat-tricks

References

External links

Profile at the FC Porto website

1992 births
Living people
People from Bushehr
Iranian footballers
Association football forwards
Iranjavan players
Shahin Bushehr F.C. players
Persepolis F.C. players
Al-Gharafa SC players
Rio Ave F.C. players
FC Porto players
Azadegan League players
Persian Gulf Pro League players
Qatar Stars League players
Primeira Liga players
Iran under-20 international footballers
Iran international footballers
Iranian expatriate footballers
Iranian expatriate sportspeople in Qatar
Iranian expatriate sportspeople in Portugal
Expatriate footballers in Qatar
Expatriate footballers in Portugal
2018 FIFA World Cup players
2019 AFC Asian Cup players
2022 FIFA World Cup players